The Evelyn 25 is an American trailerable sailboat that was designed by Bob Evelyn as a racer-cruiser and first built in 1984.

Production
The design was built by Formula Yachts in Groton, Connecticut United States from 1984 to 1985, with six boats completed, but it is now out of production.

Design
The Evelyn 25 is a recreational keelboat, built predominantly of fiberglass with a Divinycell core and with wood trim. It has a masthead sloop rig, a raked stem, a reverse transom, an internally mounted spade-type rudder controlled by a tiller and a fixed fin keel. It displaces  and carries  of lead ballast.

The boat is normally fitted with a small  outboard motor for docking and maneuvering.

The design has sleeping accommodation for four people, with a double "V"-berth in the bow cabin and two straight settee berths in the main cabin. A fold-down navigation station is provided. The head is fully enclosed.

Operational history
In a 2010 review Steve Henkel wrote, "this boat, built at designer-builder Bob Evelyn’s high-tech facility in Groton, CT, was meant to be light ... Her hull, laid up by hand, uses a Divinycell core, unidirectional fiberglass, and carbon-fiber stiffening ... Best features: Hardware is top quality, including a keel-stepped mast from Hall Spars, Harken ball-bearing traveler, and dual-speed winches. Worst features: In 1985 the management at Formula Yachts predicted that the boat's PHRF rating would turn out to be in 'the low 170s'. Even after more than a decade of race course performance, the boat's performance has been in the range of 147—perhaps testifying to the owners' passion for racing."

See also
List of sailing boat types

References

External links
Photo of an Evelyn 25
Photo of an Evelyn 25

Keelboats
1980s sailboat type designs
Sailing yachts
Trailer sailers
Sailboat type designs by Bob Evelyn
Sailboat types built by Formula Yachts